The 1924 All-Ireland Senior Hurling Championship Final was the 37th All-Ireland Final and the culmination of the 1924 All-Ireland Senior Hurling Championship, an inter-county hurling tournament for the top teams in Ireland. The match was held at Croke Park, Dublin, on 14 December 1924, between Galway and Dublin. The Connacht men lost to the Leinster champions on a score line of 5-3 to 2-6. A booklet on Dublin's season titled ‘Dublin 1924: Match Reports from the Dublin’s All-Ireland Senior Hurling Championship win of 1924’, compiled by Marie Bennett, was published for charity in 2022.

Match details

1
All-Ireland Senior Hurling Championship Finals
Dublin GAA matches
Galway GAA matches
All-Ireland Senior Hurling Championship Final
All-Ireland Senior Hurling Championship Final, 1924